is a railway station in the village of Sekikawa, Niigata Prefecture, Japan, operated by East Japan Railway Company (JR East).

Lines
Echigo-Kanamaru Station is served by the Yonesaka Line, and is located 67.8 rail kilometers from the terminus of the line at Yonezawa Station.

Station layout
The station had two opposed ground-level side platforms connected to the station building by a footbridge. Sometime in early 2018 the switch's (severed north and south of the station) connecting to the side track which serviced the western platform was removed and the footbridge taken down while the eastern platform is still in use. The station is unattended.

Platforms

History
Echigo-Kanamaru Station opened on 30 November 1933. The station was absorbed into the JR East network upon the privatization of JNR on 1 April 1987.

Surrounding area
 
Sekikawa village hall

See also
 List of railway stations in Japan

External links

 JR East Station information 

Railway stations in Niigata Prefecture
Yonesaka Line
Railway stations in Japan opened in 1933
Sekikawa, Niigata